The International League of Independent Professional Base Ball Clubs, also referred to as the International League, was a baseball league composed of a mix of white, Cuban and Negro league baseball teams in Philadelphia, Pennsylvania, as well as New Jersey and Wilmington, Delaware, during the summer of 1906. The league was planned to continue the following year, but never materialized for 1907.

The league was not a traditional "Negro league," since fewer than half the teams had all-black rosters. It was initially composed of five teams (one white American, two Cuban, and two African American), with three later replacement teams.

Teams

The Havana Stars dissolved in June and were replaced by Riverton–Palmyra; the Cuban Stars and Quaker Giants stopped playing their league schedule in July and both were replaced.

 Cuban Stars of Havana — primarily Cuban roster
 Wilmington Giants — replaced Cuban Stars in July
 Cuban X-Giants — primarily negro/Cuban roster
 Havana Stars — primarily Cuban roster
 Riverton–Palmyra Athletic Club — replaced Havana Stars in June; primarily white roster
 Philadelphia Professionals — primarily white roster
 Philadelphia Quaker Giants — based in New York; primarily negro roster
 Philadelphia Giants — replaced Quaker Giants in July

Freihofer Cup Champion
Winners of the season were awarded the Freihofer Cup, named after league president William Freihofer. Only 40 games were scheduled; eight games per team with each team playing each other twice.

The Philadelphia Giants were declared the champions even though they joined the league later as a replacement team.  They inherited a 3-0 record from the Quaker Giants and finished their schedule going 4-1, for an official record of 7-1.

References

External links
Baseball-Reference (Minors)

Negro baseball leagues
Defunct baseball leagues in the United States